Charvatce is a municipality and village in Mladá Boleslav District in the Central Bohemian Region of the Czech Republic. It has about 300 inhabitants.

Notable people
Vladimir Pavlecka (1901–1908), Czech-American aircraft designer

References

Villages in Mladá Boleslav District